Yalca is a locality in northern Victoria, Australia in the local government area of the Shire of Moira.

Yalca post office opened on 9 September 1879, and closed on 23 August 1957. Yalca East State School post office opened in 1902, was renamed Yalca East in 1906 and closed in 1907. Yalca North Post Office opened in 1902 and was closed in 1930.

References

External links

Towns in Victoria (Australia)
Shire of Moira